Husband of His Wife is a Polish comedy from 1960 directed by Stanisław Bareja and based upon the play by Jerzy Jurandot.

Starring
 Bronisław Pawlik as composer Michał Karcz
 Aleksandra Zawieruszanka as sprinter Jadwiga Fołtasiówna-Karcz
 Mieczysław Czechowicz as coach Mamczyk
 Elżbieta Czyżewska as Renata daughter of professor Trębski
 Wiesław Gołas as boxer Józek Ciapuła
 Wanda Łuczycka as Kowalska, Karczes housekeeper
 Wojciech Pokora

Plot
The story of a newly married couple, Michał Karcz (composer) and sprinter Jadwiga Fołtasiówna-Karcz. Michał has to adjust to Jadwiga being much more famous and her fame and needs dominating their lives.

External links

1960 films
Films directed by Stanisław Bareja
1960s Polish-language films
1960 comedy films
Polish comedy films
1961 comedy films
1961 films